Galeopsis speciosa, the large-flowered hemp-nettle or Edmonton hempnettle, is a species of annual herbaceous plants in the family Lamiaceae. It is native to northern + central Europe and Siberia, and has become a widespread introduced weed in Canada.  The plant is poisonous and causes paralysis.

References

speciosa
Flora of Europe
Flora of Siberia
Plants described in 1768
Taxa named by Philip Miller